Nameless is an unincorporated community in Laurens County, in the U.S. state of Georgia.

History
The town's name of Nameless was selected when all other names submitted to postal authorities were rejected. A post office was then established as Nameless in 1886, and remained in operation until being discontinued in 1901.

References

Unincorporated communities in Laurens County, Georgia
Unincorporated communities in Georgia (U.S. state)